Marquis Mathieu (born May 31, 1973) is an American former professional ice hockey player.

Mathieu was born in Hartford, Connecticut. As a youth, he played in the 1987 Quebec International Pee-Wee Hockey Tournament with a minor ice hockey team from Rive-Sud. He later played 16 games in the National Hockey League for the Boston Bruins.

Career statistics

Regular season and playoffs

References

External links

1973 births
Living people
American men's ice hockey centers
Baton Rouge Kingfish players
Beauport Harfangs players
Birmingham Bulls (ECHL) players
Boston Bruins players
Fredericton Canadiens players
Ice hockey players from Connecticut
Kölner Haie players
Houston Aeros (1994–2013) players
Johnstown Chiefs players
Pensacola Ice Pilots players
Providence Bruins players
Quebec RadioX players
Raleigh IceCaps players
Saint-Jean Lynx players
Sportspeople from Hartford, Connecticut
Toledo Storm players
Undrafted National Hockey League players
Wheeling Nailers players
Wheeling Thunderbirds players
Wilkes-Barre/Scranton Penguins players
Worcester IceCats players